Starmind is a science fiction novel by American writers Spider Robinson and Jeanne Robinson. It first appeared as a four-part serial in Analog Science Fiction and Fact in 1994, and in book form the following year.

References

American science fiction novels
Works originally published in Analog Science Fiction and Fact
1994 American novels
Novels first published in serial form
Ace Books books